A pirogue ( or ), also called a piragua or piraga, is any of various small boats, particularly dugouts and native canoes. The word is French and is derived from Spanish piragua , which comes from the Carib .

Description
The term 'pirogue' does not refer to a specific kind of boat, but is a generic term for small native boats in regions once colonized by France and Spain, particularly dugouts made from a single log. In French West Africa, the term refers to handcrafted banana-shaped boats used by traditional fishermen. In Madagascar, it also includes the more elaborate Austronesian lakana outrigger canoe.

Pirogues are usually propelled by paddles that have one blade (as opposed to a kayak paddle, which has two). It can also be punted with a push pole in shallow water. Small sails are built by local fishermen, and they can also be employed. There are two types of sails with differences in their shapes: the square one is used mainly for fishing near the coast and is only useful for Tailwind, while the triangular-shaped ones are used to transfer goods from one place to another by maintaining a bowline direction. Outboard motors are increasingly being used in many regions.

Uses in military and piracy contexts

There are accounts of 17th and 18th century Caribbean pirates using pirogues to attack and take by force much larger vessels including sloops and even barca-longas. Pirogues were used extensively by pirates and buccaneers throughout the Caribbean, the now-Mexican and Gulf Coasts and the East Coast of what is now the United States. For the most part, though, such vessels were used for scouting or as tenders.

Pirogues were used by Lewis and Clark on the Missouri River and westward from 1804–1806, in addition to bateaux, larger flat-bottomed boats that could only be used in large rivers. Their pirogues were medium-sized boats of the company carrying eight rowers and a pilot, capable of carrying eight tons of cargo. Henry D. Thoreau writes of using heavy pirogues in his book The Maine Woods.

Louisiana

Pirogues in the United States are associated particularly with the Cajuns of the Louisiana marsh. The early Creole  pirogues were cypress dugouts but today they are usually flat-bottomed boats. Pirogues are not usually intended for overnight travel but are light and small enough to be easily taken onto land. The design also allows the pirogue to move through the very shallow water of marshes and be easily turned over to drain any water that may get into the boat. A pirogue has "hard chines" which means that instead of a smooth curve from the gunwales to the keel, there is often a flat bottom which meets the plane of the side. 

In his 1952 classic song "Jambalaya", Hank Williams refers to the pirogue in the line "me gotta go pole the pirogue down the bayou". Johnny Horton, an avid Louisiana fisherman who celebrated Cajun customs and culture, also mentions pirogues in his 1956 song "I Got a Hole in My Pirogue". Hank Williams, Jr. (son of the aforementioned Hank Williams) had a hit song in 1969 "Cajun Baby", which refers to the pirogue in the line "ride around in my old pirogue".

Doug Kershaw's 1961 hit "Louisiana Man" includes the line "he jumps in his pirogue headed down the bayou". Many online lyrics sites misunderstand this line, saying 'hero' or sometimes 'biro' instead.

See also
 Periagua, a cognate which became applied to a different kind of sailing vessel in the 18th century
 Perahu
 Mackinaw boat

References

External links
Pirogues: time-tested craft for hunters and fishermen

Types of fishing vessels
Cajun
West Africa
Symbols of Illinois